Mamousia (Greek: Μαμουσιά) is a village and a community in the municipal unit of Diakopto, Achaea, Greece. It is 6 km southwest of Diakopto, on the west side of the Vouraikos gorge. In 2011 the population was 214 for the village and 355 for the community, which includes the villages Derveni and Stavria.

Population

History

The ancient city Boura was located near present Mamousia. The city had an ancient theatre most of which has yet to be excavated; several artifacts are on display at the Aigio Archeological Museum. Boura was destroyed in an earthquake in 373 BC. Mamousia suffered damage from the 2007 Greek forest fires.

External links
 Mamousia GTP Travel Pages

See also

List of settlements in Achaea

References

Aigialeia
Diakopto
Populated places in Achaea